Katherine Mary Clerk Maxwell (1824 – 12 December 1886) was a Scottish physical scientist best known for her observations which supported and contributed to the discoveries of her husband, James Clerk Maxwell. Most notable of these are her involvement with his colour vision and viscosity of gases experiments. She was born Katherine Dewar in 1824 in Glasgow and married Clerk Maxwell in 1858.

Early life and marriage 
Katherine Mary Dewar was born in 1824 in Glasgow, the daughter of Susan Place and the Presbyterian Rev. Daniel Dewar, Principal of Marischal College, Aberdeen. Little of her early life appears to be recorded.

When she was in her early 30s she met James Clerk Maxwell (7 years her junior) during his tenure as Professor of Natural Philosophy at Marischal College (1856–1860). Her father, Rev. Daniel Dewar developed a friendship with James which resulted in his frequent visits to the Dewar household as well as an invitation to join them on a family holiday. James announced their engagement in February 1858 and they were married in the parish of Old Machar, Aberdeen, on 2 June 1858. The couple did not have children.

Scientific contribution 
Before and during their marriage Katherine aided James in his experiments on colour vision and gases. Katherine's observations were valuable to James' scientific work. In his publication in the Philosophical Transactions titled "On the Theory of Compound Colours, and the Relations of the Colours of the Spectrum", James records the observations of two individuals. He reveals himself as the first observer labeled J, but describes the second individual anonymously as "another observer (K)." Lewis Campbell confirms that the observer K was indeed Katherine.

Colour vision experiments 

The apparatus used in the colour vision experiments is depicted in Fig. 1. A mirror at M reflects light coming through the opening at BC towards a lens at L. Two equilateral prisms at P refract light coming from the three slits at X, Y, and Z. This illuminated the prisms with the combination of the spectral colours created by the diffraction of the light from the slits. This light was also visible through the lens at L. The observer then peered through the slit at E while the operator adjusted the position and width of each slit at X, Y, and Z until the observer could not distinguish the prism light from the pure white light reflected by the mirror. The position and width of each slit was then recorded.

James and Katherine performed this experiment in their home. Their neighbours supposedly thought that they were "mad to spend so many hours staring into a coffin." Katherine's observations differed from James's on several accounts. James described these differences in section XIII of his publication, noting that there was a "measurable difference" between the colours perceived by each observer. Campbell also cites readings by C. H. Cay to be different from Katherine's, although a third observer is not listed in this particular Philosophical Transactions publication. This led him to develop his theory of colour vision and to discover the commonly occurring blindness of the Foramen Centrale to blue light.

Viscosity of gas experiments 
In a letter to P.G. Tait, James Clerk Maxwell wrote about Katherine's contribution to measurements of gaseous viscosity associated with his paper "On the Dynamical Theory of Gases", saying that Katherine "did all the real work of the kinetic theory" and that she was now "...engaged in other researches. When she is done I will let you know her answer to your inquiry [about experimental data]". Some of the more arduous work performed by Katherine in these experiments involved keeping a fire continuously stoked for hours on end for the purpose of producing steam from a kettle.

Personal life 

After the merger of Marischal College with Kings College to form the new University of Aberdeen in 1860, James Clerk Maxwell lost his position and the couple moved to London for five years whilst Katherine's husband took up the role of Natural Philosophy Chair at King's College. Katherine nursed her husband through smallpox in September 1860 at the Maxwell family estate, then through erysipelas following a riding incident in September 1865. The Maxwells were avid riders. In a letter to a friend and colleague, James mentioned their regular outings to the Brig of Urr, mounted on their horses Darling and Charlie. Charlie was a bay pony that James bought for Katherine at a horse fair where James allegedly contracted smallpox. Charlie was named after Charles Hope Cay, the very friend to whom James wrote.

The couple moved to the Maxwell estate, Glenlair, in around 1865, with James using this time to write up some of his key work. In 1871 James Clerk Maxwell became Cambridge University's first Cavendish Professor of Experimental Physics. During this time the couple lived in Cambridge but continued to spend summers at Glenlair.

Katherine had a number of health issues and suffered a prolonged illness in 1876, which her husband nursed her through. Despite this, and Katherine's role in caring for her husband, Margaret Tait (wife of P. G. Tait) is said to have accused Katherine of derailing her husband's career because of her illness and James Clerk Maxwell's care for her. 

Katherine was widowed when James Clerk Maxwell died of stomach cancer on 5 November 1879. On the day of his death James expressed concern for Katherine's health. Little is known about Katherine's life during the seven years between her husband's death and her own.

She died in Cambridge on 12 December 1886 and is buried alongside her husband in Parton, Dumfries and Galloway. She did not have any children.

References 

19th-century British women scientists
19th-century British physicists
Scottish women physicists
1886 deaths
1824 births
Burials in Dumfries and Galloway
Scottish physicists
Scientists from Glasgow